Anna Patterson is a software engineer and a seminal contributor to search engines.

Education 
Patterson received her B.S. in Computer Science and another in Electrical Engineering from McKelvey School of Engineering at Washington University in St. Louis and her Ph.D. from the University of Illinois at Urbana–Champaign and was a Research Scientist at Stanford University in artificial intelligence working with John McCarthy on Phenomenal Data Mining and Carolyn Talcott on theorem provers.

Career 
As of 2017 she was Founder and Managing Partner at Gradient Ventures and Vice President of Engineering at Google. While she was working in Google's Android organization, Patterson was responsible for a division of Google Play including Books and Search, Recommendations and Infrastructure for scaling up Android from 40 million phones to over 800 million phones.

She co-founded Cuil, a clustering-based search engine (which she created after leaving Google in 2007) and wrote Recall.archive.org (part of the Wayback Machine), a history-based search engine out of the Internet Archive, which showed trends over time.

Awards and honors 
Patterson was a winner of the 2016 ABIE Award. She also served on the board of Square Inc. She was previously a trustee at Harvey Mudd College and a trustee at the Mathematical Sciences Research Institute  and on the National Engineering Council at Washington University in St. Louis.

References

Year of birth missing (living people)
Living people
Google employees
McKelvey School of Engineering alumni
University of Illinois Urbana-Champaign alumni
Washington University in St. Louis people